So Uncool is the debut studio album by American singer and actress Keke Palmer. The album was released on September 18, 2007 by Atlantic Records. 

Even though it received a positive review, the album did not perform well on the Billboard charts. In 2009, Palmer moved from Atlantic to Interscope Records.

Singles 
The lead single "Footworkin'" was released on July 4, 2007. A concert tour was created to promote the single.

"Keep It Movin'" was released on July 17, 2007 as the second single. It features rapper Big Meech. It was sent to US Mainstream radio on August 7, 2007, after being released in Europe on July 17.

Promotional singles 
"Skin Deep" was released as the only promotional single on July 17, 2007, along with Keep It Movin'.

Track listing

Charts

References 

2007 debut albums
Keke Palmer albums
Albums produced by Focus...
Albums produced by Rodney Jerkins
Albums produced by Toby Gad
Albums produced by J. R. Rotem
Atlantic Records albums